Herman Sinitzyn (February 1, 1940, Chișinău – June 25, 2016, Los Angeles) was a Russian and American actor. Artist blues on blues harmonica. A member of the Screen Actors Guild.

Biography
Herman  Sinitsyn was born in Chișinău in 1940. After moving with his family to Leningrad, he served in the army and entered the Leningrad State University on the faculty of foreign languages. For a long time he worked as a translator. The first steps in the acting profession Herman did back in the years of service in the army.

Arriving in the United States, he continued to work as a translator. The will of fate landed a role in a movie The Hunt for Red October. In this film, he starred in a cameo the midshipman and received three days of shooting 40,000 dollars.

Filmography
1990: The Hunt for Red October as Seaman #5 - Red October
1994: Love Affair as Russian Waiter
1995: ER (Episode: Everything Old Is New Again) as Uncle Michel
1996: 2090 as Victor
1998: Team Knight Rider (Episode: Home Away from Home) as KGB Officer Markov
2003:  Russians in the City of Angels (Episode: Semya)  
2004: Alias (Episode: The Frame) as Petr Berezovsky
2008: General Hospital as Russian Priest
2008: Tsunami Beach Club as Dr. Peankov
2012: Joseph as Jacob
2013: Zoochosis (Episode: Case 04: Magic) as Sailor
2013: Cleaver Family Reunion as Elderly Man
2013:  The Eric Andre Show (TV Series)
2014: Esther (TV Movie) as Hadar
2015: A Night at Christmas (TV Movie) as Balthazar
2017: Merrily as Kliment 
Music video
 Avril Lavigne: Let Me Go
 Katy Perry: The One That Got Away

Personal life
He was divorced. A daughter Anastasia.

References

External links 
 
 Как я пробивался в звезды Голливуда, Argumenty i Fakty
 «Помещик Крамаров слушает», Voice of America

1940 births
2016 deaths
Soviet emigrants to the United States
Actors from Chișinău
Russian male actors
American male film actors
American male television actors
Saint Petersburg State University alumni